Welcome, First Time in Korea? is a South Korean television show that airs on MBC every1. The show is in a reality television-travel show format and first aired on June 1, 2017. Each trip features a foreigner living in South Korea who invites three friends from their home country to travel to South Korea for the first time. The trips typically follow the format of the three friends traveling on their own for the first two days, followed by a two-day special tour organized by the hosting foreigner. Episodes also include concurrent commentary from a panel of hosts, together with the guest whose friends are featured.

In April 2020, the show changed to a "Living in Korea" special format due to travel restrictions resulting from the COVID-19 pandemic. However, they promised to return to the original concept once the world is able to comfortably travel abroad again. The revised format is similar to I Live Alone and My Neighbour, Charles, introducing the daily life and experiences of foreigners residing in Korea.

In July 2022, the show was rebooted to its original format as travel restrictions eased, allowing foreigners to easily visit South Korea again.

Hosts

Special hosts 

 Mina Fujii (September 28 – October 12, 2017)
 Christian Burgos (July 5 – July 26, 2018)
 Jo Seung-yeon (September 27 – October 18, 2018)
 Byul (April 11 – May 2, 2019)
 Sujan Shakya (September 5 – September 26, 2019)
 Daniel Lindemann (July 7 – August 4, 2022)
"Vilppu's Diner" Special 
Kim Min-kyung (July 8 – August 26, 2021)
Hong Ji-yoon (July 8 – August 26, 2021)
Leo Ranta (August 5 – August 19, 2021)

List of episodes

Pilot (June 1–15, 2017)

Season 1 (July 27, 2017 – March 8, 2018)

Season 2 (2018 – present)

"Living in Korea" Special 
The show's format changed due to the COVID-19 pandemic. Instead of having foreigners travel to Korea, the guests are foreigners already living in the country who show aspects of their daily life and experiences in Korea.

Reboot 
As government regulations on entry into South Korea and on-arrival quarantine eased in 2022, the show was able to return to its original premise of foreigners visiting the country for the first time. This reboot of the original concept started airing from July 2022, with host Kim Jun-hyun returning to the studio panel alongside new host Lee Hyun-yi.

Awards and nominations

Notes

References

External links
 

South Korean reality television series
South Korean travel television series
2017 South Korean television series debuts
Television shows set in South Korea
Multiculturalism in South Korea
Television series impacted by the COVID-19 pandemic